"Double Crossing Blues" is a 1950 song by the Johnny Otis Quintette, the Robins, and Little Esther. It was released as a 78-rpm single (731-A) by Savoy Records in 1950. The single went to number one on the US Billboard R&B chart.

Song background
"Double Crossing Blues" was the debut single for Little Esther, who was then fourteen years old, making her the youngest female singer to have a number-one single on the R&B chart. The original Savoy record label showed Otis as the writer, but the actual composer, Jessie Mae Robinson, sued, won an out-of-court settlement in March 1950, and copyrighted the song under her own name.

References

1950 songs
1950 singles
Soul songs
Songs written by Johnny Otis
Savoy Records singles
Esther Phillips songs